VSFighting is a tournament series of annual esports events that focuses on competitive fighting games. The tournament is open to all. VSF is the flagship tournament to Electronic Dojo, a fighting games community based in the West Midlands, UK.

History 
The first tournament took place in a function room in Birmingham's Irish Club, in 2012 VSF was moved to a different venue and in 2014 VSF hosted the finals live in an IMAX theatre.

The event has been featured as a Premier Event for the Capcom Pro Tour, a Premier Event for the Injustice Pro Series  a Master Event for the Tekken World Tour, part of the Mortal Kombat Pro Kompetition, part of the Dead or Alive 6 World Tour  and an event on the Dragon Ball FighterZ World Tour. It continues to support a range of fighters, balancing the heavyweight mainstays with side events for other popular fan titles, arcade machines and the occasional demo for unreleased games. The only game to have been appeared at every VSF is Super Street Fighter II X.

2010 (VSFighting) 
The first in the tournament series VSF and taking place at the Irish Centre, Birmingham on September 12.

2012 (VSFighting II) 
In 2012 it announced that VSFighting II would be help at 'The Public' Birmingham on July 14, 2012. Other notable events included a side tournament of Super Street Fighter II X (Dreamcast) and support from Bandai Namco Entertainment to showcase Tekken Tag Tournament 2 on an arcade machine shipped from Japan.

2013 (VSFighting III) 
In 2013 VSFighting remained at 'The Public', Birmingham, however this was the first VSF to be two day event on August 10–11. Also this would mark August as becoming the annual month for future VSFighting tournaments to be held.

2014 (VSFighting 4) 
VSFighting 4 hosted the first UK Capcom Premier event at Millennium Point, Birmingham on 23–24 August 2014.

2015 (VSFighting 5) 
VSFighting changed venue again, this time it was held in the centre of Birmingham at The Birmingham Repertory Theatre and newly build Birmingham Library on August 8–09.

2016 (VSFighting 2016) 
VSFighting 2016 was held at a new ‘Studio’ venue, again located in central Birmingham on August 6–7. This time around, the event included Tekken 7 (courtesy of Bandai Namco Entertainment) as well as a hands on with the superb Blazblue: Central Fiction.

2017 (VSFighting 2017) 
VSFighting 2017 took place on 12–13 August with the entire event being held at the Millennium Point, Birmingham.  The tournament featured 7 games, Injustice 2, Street Fighter V, Tekken 7, BlazBlue Guilty Gear Xrd REV 2, Killer Instinct and Super Smash Bros. for Wii U

2018 (VSFighting 2018) 
VSFighting 2017 took place on 20–22 July with the entire event being held at the Millennium Point, Birmingham.  The tournament featured 8 games, Street Fighter V: Arcade Edition, Tekken 7, Dragon Ball FighterZ, Guilty Gear Xrd REV 2, BlazBlue: Tag Battle,  Injustice 2, Under Night In-Birth Exe: Late[st] and Super Street Fighter II Turbo.

2019 (VSFighting 2019) 
VSFighting 2019 took place on 20–21 July with the entire event being held at the Millennium Point, Birmingham.  The tournament featured 8 games, Street Fighter V: Arcade Edition, Tekken 7, Mortal Kombat 11, Dragon Ball FighterZ,  Samurai Showdown, SoulCalibur VI, Dead or Alive 6 and Super Street Fighter II Turbo.

2022 (VSFighting X) 
VSFighting 2022 took place on 19–21 August with the entire event being held at the Millennium Point, Birmingham. The tournament featured 6 games, Street Fighter V: CE, Tekken 7, Guilty Gear Strive, King of Fighters XV, Dragon Ball FighterZ, and DNF Duel. An additional 6 games were ran by the community Super Street Fighter II Turbo, Ultra Street Fighter IV, Ultimate Marvel vs Capcom 3, SoulCalibur VI, and Virtua Fighter 5. Capcom UK also brought along the current demo of Street Fighter 6.

References

External links 
 

Fighting game tournaments
Super Smash Bros. tournaments